Surbiton is a suburban neighbourhood in South West London, within the Royal Borough of Kingston upon Thames (RBK). Surbiton was in the historic county of Surrey and since 1965 it has been in Greater London. Surbiton comprises four of the RBK's wards: Alexandra, Berrylands, St. Mark's, and Surbiton Hill.

Founded originally as Kingston-upon-Railway when the area was first developed in the 1840s, Surbiton possesses a mixture of grand 19th-century townhouses, Art Deco courts, and more recent residential blocks blending in with semi-detached 20th-century housing estates. With a population of 45,132 in 2016, it accounts for approximately 25% of the total population of the Royal Borough of Kingston upon Thames.

Etymology
Though Surbiton only received its current name in 1869, the name is attested as Suberton in 1179, Surbeton in 1263, Surpeton in 1486, and finally Surbiton 1597. Sūth Bere-tūn means "southern grange" or "outlying farm" in Old English, as opposed to nearby Norbiton; both Norbiton and Surbiton were possessions of the royal manor of Kingston.

History

The present-day town came into existence after a plan to build a London-Southampton railway line through nearby Kingston was rejected by Kingston Council, who feared that it would be detrimental to the coaching trade. This resulted in the line being routed further south, through a cutting in the hill south of Surbiton. Surbiton railway station opened in 1838, and was originally named Kingston-upon-Railway. It was only renamed Surbiton to distinguish it from the new Kingston railway station on the Shepperton branch line, which opened on 1 January 1869. The present station has an art deco façade.

As a result, Kingston is now on a branch line, whereas passengers from Surbiton (smaller in comparison) can reach London Waterloo in as little as 16 minutes on a fast direct service; as well as places further afield, including Portsmouth and Southampton.

Surbiton was once home to Surbiton Studios which were owned by Stoll Pictures, before the company shifted its main production to Cricklewood Studios.

Politics

National politics

Surbiton falls within the UK parliamentary constituency of Kingston and Surbiton, which is represented in the House of Commons by Sir Ed Davey, a Liberal Democrat who served as Secretary of State for Energy and Climate Change during the Conservative–Liberal Democrat coalition. Davey also represented the constituency between 1997 and 2015, having been ousted for a short period of time by Conservative James Berry. In the 2017 general election, Davey went on to defeat Berry by 45% to 38%. Both Davey's and Berry's offices were located in Surbiton's Berrylands ward.

In the 2016 United Kingdom European Union membership referendum, Kingston and Surbiton voted to remain a member of the European Union by 61.7% of the local vote.

London politics

Surbiton is represented in the London Assembly by Conservative Tony Arbour, as part of Greater London's South West constituency.

Local councillors
Surbiton elects 12 of the Kingston upon Thames London Borough Council's 48 councillors. As of the 2018 local elections, the council is controlled by the Liberal Democrats, and all Surbiton's elected councillors are members of that party.

Transport

Surbiton is served by a number of regular bus services. Transport for London bus routes 71, 281, 406, 418, 465, K1, K2, K3, and K4, as well as Hallmark Connections route 458, Reptons Coaches route 513, Falcon Coaches routes 514 and 515, and Stagecoach South route 715 all serve the area. These provide links to Chessington, Kingston town centre, Twickenham, Hounslow, Epsom, Leatherhead, Dorking, Cobham, Staines, Weybridge and Guildford.

Surbiton is also close to two of London's largest airports: Heathrow and Gatwick.

Railways have served the town since it was founded. Surbiton and Berrylands stations are both served by South Western Railway services. It provides rail links to London Waterloo, Surrey and Hampshire.

If approval is granted for the project, Surbiton will be connected with the London Underground system via Crossrail 2. It is expected that the project will relieve pressure on both Surbiton and Berrylands stations.

Surbiton lacks major motorways, although the A3 road cuts through Berrylands ward at Tolworth Underpass. Parts of the A307 that run along the River Thames, Portsmouth Road, have become part of the London cycle routes network.

Architecture

Education

Demographics

Religion
Until the early 19th century, Surbiton, like Norbiton, lay in the parish of All Saints, Kingston upon Thames. As a result, Surbiton's two town centre parish churches, Saint Mark's and Saint Andrew's, date back only to the Victorian era.

There are two further Anglican parish churches in south Surbiton, Christ Church and Saint Matthew's, both also Victorian.

Christ Church was built in 1862–63, by Charles Lock Luck and lengthened in 1866. The chancel aisles were added in 1864, and 1871. It has no tower, and is built of red brick with stone dressings with some black brick voussoirs. The east stained glass window was done by Clayton and Bell, the central stained glass window by Burne-Jones, while the other stained glass was done by Lavers, Barraud and Westlake.

Saint Matthew's was completed in 1875, having taken less than 2 years to build. The church and the original vicarage were paid for by one man, William Matthew Coulthurst, who was the senior partner of Coutts Bank. On the outside of the east end of the church, there is a stone plaque recording this and the fact that it was partly built in memory of Hannah Mabella Coulthurst, the dead sister of William Matthew Coulthurst. Built into the wall behind the plaque, there is a photograph of Hannah, a copy of 'The Times' newspaper of the day and a letter from William Coulthurst stipulating that the church should remain in the evangelical tradition. The church and vicarage cost £26,500. The old vicarage was pulled down in 1939 and a subsequent one was built on the same plot. In 2012, work started on a new vicarage on part of the plot and this was completed in 2013. The East stained-glass window by Henry Holiday was destroyed by a V-1 flying bomb on 23 June 1944. They were replaced in 1953 with windows by Hugh Easton, with his maker's mark of a weather vane signed H Easton with a cockerel on the top. The Clayton memorial triptych window was installed in 1921, designed by Louis Davis, 'the last of the Pre-Raphaelites', and made by Thomas Cowall (1870-1949) for James Powell and Sons. The Caporn memorial window was installed in 1970 and designed by W T Carter Shapland who had also designed the West window at St Mark's. Some of the original windows by Powell & Sons survive, known as Quarry windows because they are made up of pre-stamped diamond-shaped glass known as 'Quarries'. 

Other churches in Surbiton include Surbiton Hill Methodist Church on Ewell Road, opened in 1882, and the Roman Catholic church of Saint Raphael's, completed in 1848 and located to the north of Surbiton, in the Kingston upon Thames postal district.

In recent years, Surbiton has become more diverse in terms of religion, the Surbiton area having a Sikh Gurdwara and an Orthodox Jewish synagogue. According to the 2011 Census, Muslims form the largest minority religious community at about 5% of the population; the nearest mosque is located in Kingston upon Thames.

Nationality
Approximately 74% of Surbiton's residents at the 2011 Census were born in the United Kingdom (73% in Alexandra, 71% in St. Mark's, 75% in Surbiton Hill, 76% in Berrylands). The largest ethnic group, with two-thirds of the population, is "White British", with "White Other" the second largest group at just under 10%.

Sport
Surbiton Lawn Tennis Club hosted international tennis from 1900 (Surrey Grass Court Championships - SGCC) until 1981 at the tennis Club in Berrylands. From 1998 to 2008 international tennis returned to Surbiton with an event hosted by the Lawn Tennis Association (LTA) and Surbiton Racket & Fitness Club (SRFC). The Surbiton Trophy was part of the ATP Challenger Series and in 2009 the event was moved to Nottingham as part of a reorganisation by the LTA. The event came back to SRFC in 2015 and continues to be played at Berrylands.

Surbiton F.C. was a short-lived football club that was among the founders of The Football Association in 1863. Surbiton is the current home of both male and female football teams, Darkside FC, Surbiton Wanderers and Surbiton Town Ladies FC.

Surbiton Hockey Club, established in 1874, is regarded as one of the best hockey clubs in the country. Its men's and ladies' 1st XIs currently both play in their respective national premier leagues, while its youth section regularly produces players of international quality.

Surbiton is also the home to Surbiton Croquet Club, which is amongst the strongest croquet clubs in the country and, with seven lawns, one of the largest.

The Cooper Car Company was based in a garage on Hollyfield Road from 1946 to 1968, celebrating wins in the Formula One Constructors Championships in 1959 and 1960 and developing the iconic Mini Cooper in 1961.

Popular culture and notable residents

Resident artists and writers

The Pre-Raphaelite painters John Everett Millais (1829–1896) and William Holman Hunt (1827–1910) came to Surbiton in 1851, 26 years before Richard Jefferies (1848–1887). Millais used the Hogsmill River, in Six Acre Meadow, Tolworth, as the background for his painting Ophelia. Holman Hunt used the fields just south of this spot as the background to The Hireling Shepherd.

In the mid-1870s the novelist Thomas Hardy (1840–1928) lived in a house called 'St. David's Villa' in Hook Road, Surbiton for a year after his marriage to Emma Gifford. H.G.Wells, in his comic novel The Wheels of Chance, describes the cycle collision of 'Mr Hoopdriver' and a 'Young Lady in Grey'; the young lady approaching 'along an affluent from the villas of Surbiton'. The writer Enid Blyton was governess to a Surbiton family for four years from 1920, at a house called 'Southernhay', also on the Hook Road. C. H. Middleton (1886–1945), who broadcast on gardening during the Second World War, lived in Surbiton, where he died suddenly outside his home. The artist who brought Rupert the Bear to life for a whole generation, Alfred Bestall, sketched out his cartoons from his home in Cranes Park, Surbiton Hill.

In popular culture
Surbiton was the setting of Keble Howard's novel The Smiths of Surbiton, published in 1906. The novel proved successful and led to two sequels, The Smiths of Valley View (1909) and The Smiths in War-Time (1918), both also set in Surbiton.

A 1972 episode of Monty Python's Flying Circus featured a mock documentary which investigated whether the residents of Hounslow, another London area suburb, had long ago been descendants of the people of Surbiton "who had made the great trek north".

Surbiton is popularly remembered as an icon of suburbia in such British television programmes as The Good Life (starring Richard Briers, Penelope Keith, Paul Eddington and Felicity Kendal), though location filming was done in Northwood, North-West London, and John Sessions and Phil Cornwell's comedy series Stella Street.

Surbiton station features in the 2009 film version of Harry Potter and the Half-Blood Prince, with actors Daniel Radcliffe as Harry Potter and Michael Gambon as Albus Dumbledore. Filming took place in November 2007. The station also appears in Agatha Christie's Poirot: The Adventure of the Clapham Cook, a 1989 ITV adaptation of the short story by Agatha Christie. The station reflects the 1930s Art Deco style that often featured in locations used in the series.

The guitarist and singer-songwriter Eric Clapton purchased one of his first guitars from a shop in Surbiton called Bells; the shop has since closed.

According to the cassette insert for the 1980s computer game Manic Miner, the mine complex in which the game action takes place was located "while prospecting down Surbiton way..."

List of notable residents

Thomas John Barnardo - Irish philanthropist and founder of Barnardo's charity.
Mike Batt - Singer, songwriter, musician, known for The Wombles
George Best – a retired footballer and TV pundit before his death (having been born in Belfast and lived much of his life in Manchester)
 Alfred Bestall – illustrator of the Rupert books
 Charlie Brooks – actress
 William Bryant – co-founder of Bryant and May's matches, lived with his wife at their property 'Oakenshaw' in Surbiton
 Wilberforce Bryant – chairman of Bryant and May's matches, eldest son of co-founder William Bryant, lived at 'The Gables' (now Hillcroft College)
 Charles Burney – Archdeacon of Kingston-upon-Thames from 1879 to 1904
 Arthur Brian Burton, founder and owner of Thames Ditton Foundry
 Jane Campbell, Baroness Campbell of Surbiton – equality and human rights champion
 Rosalbina Caradori-Allan – opera singer
 Frank Cellier – actor
 Julian Clary – comedian and novelist
 William Francis Dundonald Cochrane – brigadier-general in the Army, and great-grandson of Archibald Cochrane, 9th Earl of Dundonald
 John Cooper – car maker
 Allan Cuthbertson – actor
 Ed Davey MP – politician, leader of the Liberal Democrats
 Phyllis Dixey – singer, dancer and impresario
 Bernard George Ellis – winner of the George Cross
 David Essex – musician, singer-songwriter and actor, lived on Ditton Road for 16 years until 2002.
 John Foxx – musician and digital artist, former resident
Susan George - actress
 Eileen Gray – cyclist
 Jennifer Guy – actress, Cavegirl
 Thomas Hardy – author (while completing and for the publishing of Far from the Madding Crowd)
 Roy Hodgson – football manager
 Saskia Howard-Clarke – Big Brother contestant and glamour model
 Leslie Illsley – artist and one of the founders of Troika Pottery
 James Johnston – rugby union player, lived in Surbiton until 2013 while playing for Harlequins
 Lukin Johnston – English-Canadian journalist who interviewed Adolf Hitler and subsequently disappeared
 John Keen – racing cyclist
 Rob Lee - former councillor
 Lara Lewington – television presenter, attended Surbiton High School
 Chris McCausland – comedian, Would I Lie To You?, Live at the Apollo
 John McCririck – horse racing pundit, Celebrity Big Brother (2005), and Ultimate Big Brother (2010)
 Debbie McGee – widow of late magician Paul Daniels, born in Kingston, lived in Tolworth, went to Our Lady Immaculate and Tolworth Girls' Schools
 Art Malik – actor
 Dudley Mason GC – master of the SS Ohio
 C. H. Middleton ("Mr Middleton") – gardener, writer and BBC broadcaster
 William Newton - Olympic sports shooter, killed in World War I, grew up in Surbiton where his parents settled.
 Elizabeth Norton – historian and author
 Betty Nuthall – amongst other major titles, winner of the 1930 Women's US Singles Tennis Championship, ranked number 4 in the world
 Katherine Parkinson - actress, IT Crowd
 Andy Parsons – comedian, Mock The Week
 Alf Pearson (of musical double act Bob and Alf Pearson) lived in Surbiton until 2007
 Emma, Lady Radford – English antiquarian and public servant, incl. chairman of the Kingston-upon-Thames Women's Land Army. Resided at Chiswick House, Ditton Hill, Surbiton.
 Jon Richardson – comedian, 8 out of 10 Cats, Stand Up for the Week
 L. J. K. Setright – motoring journalist and author
 Dr. Helen Sharman – first Briton in space, first woman to visit Mir space station
 David Spinx – actor
 Twinkle (Lynn Ripley) – singer
 Naunton Wayne – actor
 Jimmy White - Snooker Player
 Joe Wicks - Coach and personal trainer
 Dorothy Wrinch – first woman to receive an Oxford DSc., 1938 Nobel Prize nominee, grew up in Surbiton

Geography 
The terrain of Surbiton is relatively flat, except for a small hill near its centre. It is part of the Royal Borough of Kingston upon Thames in Greater London, and borders the Borough of Elmbridge in Surrey. Surbiton consists of several smaller areas, including much of Seething Wells.

Nearby areas 
Surbiton is a post town in the KT postcode area, consisting of the KT5 and KT6 postcode districts. KT5 includes Berrylands, Tolworth and part of Surbiton; and KT6 includes Tolworth, Long Ditton and part of Surbiton.

Gallery

References

External links
 Kingston Borough Council
 
 Surbiton People
 Surbiton Croquet Club
 Surbiton Caledonian Society
 Surbiton Parish Church

 
Areas of London
Districts of the Royal Borough of Kingston upon Thames
Districts of London on the River Thames
Railway towns in England
District centres of London